Serbia–Ukraine relations are foreign relations between Serbia and Ukraine. Serbia, as a direct successor to the Federal Republic of Yugoslavia, recognized Ukraine on 15 April 1994. Diplomatic relations between Ukraine and the Federal Republic of Yugoslavia were established on 15 April 1994.

Since 2008 Kosovo declaration of independence, Ukraine has shown a respect to the Serbia's territorial integrity in borders of 1945 (see Socialist Republic of Serbia).

Since September 2011, Serbians and Ukrainians can stay in each other's country for up to 30 days without visas. This policy was extended and now both citizens can stay in each other's country for up to 90 days in 180 days.

Both countries are members of the OSCE, Council of Europe and United Nations.

History and ethnic relations 

There are numerous Ukrainian organizations in Serbia. Ukrainian national minority has its own National Council with seat in Novi Sad.  They are closely related to Pannonian Rusyns (Ruthenians). Ukrainian-Rusyn organizations have seats in Inđija, Sremska Mitrovica, Vrbas, Kula, Đurđevo, Ruski Krstur, Šid, Kucura and Subotica. According to the 2002 census there were 5,354 ethnic Ukrainians in Serbia and 15,905 Rusyns, mostly living in Vojvodina.

In the 18th century on territory of today's Ukraine there were two provinces populated by Serbs - New Serbia and Slavo-Serbia. By the decree of the Senate of 29 May 1753, the free lands of this area were offered for settlement to peoples of Orthodox Christian denomination in order to ensure frontier protection and development of this part of Southern steppes. Slavo-Serbia was directly governed by Russia's Governing Senate. The settlers eventually formed the Bakhmut hussar regiment in 1764. Also in 1764, Slavo-Serbia was transformed into the Donets uyezd of Yekaterinoslav Governorate (now in Dnipropetrovsk oblast, Ukraine). According to the 2001 census there were only 623 Serbs living in Ukraine (219 spoke Serbian, 104 spoke Ukrainian, 218 spoke Russian and 68 some other language).

Political relations
Serbia and Ukraine have been active in bilateral meetings. In January 2001, President of Ukraine Leonid Kuchma paid a visit to Belgrade and met with the then President of the Federal Republic of Yugoslavia, Vojislav Koštunica. Prime Minister Dragiša Pešić, visited Ukraine in September 2001. President of Serbia and Montenegro Svetozar Marović, visited Ukraine in November 2003. Deputy Prime Minister of Serbia, Božidar Đelić, met with Oleksandr Turchynov, first deputy prime minister in Kyiv after the EBRD annual meeting where they have discussed future free trade agreement and situation in Kosovo. President of Ukraine Viktor Yushchenko visited Serbia in June 2009, during the XVI Summit of Heads of Central European States in Novi Sad.

Foreign Minister of Serbia, Goran Svilanović visited Ukraine in February 2002. Ukrainian Minister of Defense Yevhen Marchuk, visited Serbia in February 2004. Ukrainian Foreign Minister Kostyantyn Gryshchenko, visited Serbia in October 2004. In January 2005 Serbian Foreign minister Vuk Drašković, visited Ukraine on the occasion of the inauguration of President Viktor Yushchenko. Drašković visited Ukraine again in June 2005 and March 2006. Ukrainian Foreign minister Borys Tarasyuk visited Serbia in January 2006 and Arseniy Yatsenyuk visited Serbia in July 2007.

Zoran Šami, Speaker of the National Assembly, met Ukraine's Chairman of the Verkhovna Rada Volodymyr Lytvyn, during the session of the Parliamentary Assembly of the Organization of the Black Sea Economic Cooperation in Kyiv in June 2005.

Mayoress of Belgrade, Radmila Hrustanović, visited Kyiv in June 2002.

Officials of Serbia and Ukraine have had important meetings in multilateral arenas as well. The most important was the meeting between Presidents Kuchma and Koštunica at the Earth Summit 2002 in Johannesburg.

PORA, a civic youth organization from Ukraine, was trained by members of the similar organization from Serbia - Otpor!. Otpor movement helped bring down the regime of Slobodan Milošević during 5th October and they trained Pora members in organizing Orange Revolution against the regime of Leonid Kuchma.

In 2008, after the Serbian province of Kosovo unilaterally declared independence as the Republic of Kosovo, Chairman of the Verkhovna Rada Committee for Foreign Affairs, Oleh Bilorus, stated that "Ukraine will back Serbia's stand on Kosovo". Prime Minister Yulia Tymoshenko said that Ukraine must come up with a concept of how to regard the issue of Kosovo, either as a unique phenomenon in the world, or in the context of existence of Transdniester, Abkhazia, South Ossetia and other separatist regions.

Ukrainian President Viktor Yanukovych stated on June 4, 2010, that the recognition of the independence of Abkhazia, South Ossetia and Kosovo violates international law, "I have never recognized Abkhazia, South Ossetia or Kosovo's independence. This is a violation of international law".

Slavica Đukić Dejanović, Speaker of the National Assembly, met Ukraine's Chairman of the Verkhovna Rada Volodymyr Lytvyn in Kyiv in July 2010. They signed a document on cooperation between the parliaments of Ukraine and Serbia on July 7, 2010.

In April 2011, Ukraine's Chairman of the Verkhovna Rada Volodymyr Lytvyn visited Serbia.

In May 2011, Foreign Minister of Serbia Vuk Jeremić visited Ukraine and signed visa-free regime between the two countries.

In November 2011, Ukrainian Prime Minister Mykola Azarov visited Serbia for the Central European Initiative summit.

Serbian President Boris Tadić visited Ukraine in November 2011.

Economic relations
In 2007 exports from Serbia were US$97,700,000 and imports from Ukraine were over US$274,000,000. In 2008 the trade between the countries grew by 71%.

Ukraine and Serbia will sign a free trade agreement in autumn 2009. Ukraine supports Serbia's intention to join the World Trade Organization.

Culture and education
Serbia and Ukraine signed the Agreement on Cooperation in the Fields of Education, Culture and Sports on 24 January 1996. On the basis of this Agreement a Program of Cooperation between the two countries for the period 2002–2004 was signed in February 2002. It was agreed to extend this agreement to cover 2005 through exchange of diplomatic notes. A Memorandum of Understanding was signed on cooperation between the Diplomatic Academies at the Foreign Ministries of the two countries.

In 2004 there was signed a treaty of cooperation between the State Committee of Archives of Ukraine and the Archive of Serbia and Montenegro. Also since 2005 there exists a treaty of cooperation the Vernadsky National Library of Ukraine and the National Library of Serbia.

Defense cooperation
Ukraine and Serbia signed a Treaty on military cooperation on 4 November 2003 and ratified in August 2004. Based on this treaty there were four meetings of working groups for enhancement of the cooperation. Priorities set by two sides are mutual army modernization, development and production of arms and military equipment, involvement of Serbian companies in decontamination of radioactive ammunition in Ukraine, joint operation in third markets, exchange of information, expert consultations and training of military staff.

Cooperation between regions
 Kyiv Oblast and Autonomous Province of Vojvodina (in trade and economy, science and technology, culture, 2006)

Resident diplomatic missions
 Serbia has an embassy in Kyiv.
 Ukraine has an embassy in Belgrade.

See also 
 Foreign relations of Serbia
 Foreign relations of Ukraine
 Ukraine's reaction to the 2008 Kosovo declaration of independence
 Serbs in Ukraine
 Ukrainians in Serbia

References

External links 
 Ukrainian embassy in Belgrade
  Information regarding Serbian embassy in Kyiv
 Electronic library of Serbian-Ukrainian relations
 New Serbia and Slavo-Serbia
 Organization of Ukrainians in Serbia - «Prosvita»

 
Ukraine
Bilateral relations of Ukraine